Yelena Kvyatkovskaya (born 12 October 1965) is a Uzbekistani sprinter. She competed in the women's 4 × 100 metres relay at the 2000 Summer Olympics.

References

1965 births
Living people
Athletes (track and field) at the 2000 Summer Olympics
Uzbekistani female sprinters
Olympic athletes of Uzbekistan
Place of birth missing (living people)
Asian Games medalists in athletics (track and field)
Asian Games silver medalists for Uzbekistan
Athletes (track and field) at the 1998 Asian Games
Medalists at the 1998 Asian Games
Olympic female sprinters
20th-century Uzbekistani women